Sebastián Castedo Palero (June 10, 1871 - January 3, 1953) was a Spanish politician and minister of National Economy during the dictatorship of Primo de Rivera.

References

Economy and finance ministers of Spain
1871 births
1953 deaths